Ego Death is the third studio album by American R&B band the Internet. It was released on June 26, 2015, through Odd Future and distributed by Columbia Records. The album was supported by the singles "Special Affair" and "Girl". Ego Death was nominated at the 2016 Grammy Awards for Best Urban Contemporary Album.

Promotion
The album's lead single, "Special Affair", was released on June 2, 2015. The album's second single, "Girl", was released on June 23, 2015. The song features a guest appearance from Haitian-Canadian DJ and record producer Kaytranada.

Critical reception

Ego Death was met with widespread critical acclaim. At Metacritic, which assigns a normalized rating out of 100 to reviews from mainstream publications, the album received an average score of 81, based on 11 reviews. Aggregator AnyDecentMusic? gave it 7.1 out of 10, based on their assessment of the critical consensus.

Andy Kellman of AllMusic said, "The majority of Ego Death is tighter. Bennett has refined her songwriting without reducing the candid approach that colors her past compositions. Additionally, the tangents are fewer and more substantive". Pat Levy of Consequence said, "In addition to their more fully formed sound, one of the more exciting things about The Internet is the music's point of view". Michael J. Warren of Exclaim! said, "Ego Death frees the Internet from Odd Future connotations and R&B norms; it's their best work yet". Tshepo Mokoena of The Guardian said, "There's wit and honestly behind her observations of courting and heartbreak, making her pinhole focus on love more about nuance than navel-gazing. It's just as well the band stayed together". Ronald Grant of HipHopDX said, "Ego Death is an album both suited specifically for the social media age of music listeners but simultaneously rich and permeated with the traditions of the soul and R&B music of the past".

Jon Caramanica of The New York Times said, "There's convincing thump at work here, but not so much as to overwhelm the lustrous keyboards, the nuzzling bass, the way several of the songs unfurl like blooming roses". Sean Fennell of PopMatters said, "Ego Death and The Internet require a little bit of patience, but if you are willing to give it a full go, it will reward you with one of the most interesting albums in recent memory". Patrick Taylor of RapReviews said, "Ego Death is the perfect summer record. Breezy, smooth, lazy, and meant for warm nights". Craig Jenkins of Pitchfork said, "The Internet's songs have always felt like scenes of salaciousness happening just out of earshot. Ego Death finally pulls us into the maelstrom". Suzy Exposito of Rolling Stone said, "The best tracks fade away into gravity-defying instrumental outros that make Syd's heartache feel sublimely serene".

Industry awards

Track listing

Personnel 
Credits adapted from the album's liner notes.

The Internet
 Syd – lead vocals, production , keys , synths , background vocals , recording , executive production, mixing
 Matt Martians – production , drums , synths , background vocals , recording , executive production, design
 Patrick Paige II – bass , production , drums , guitar 
 Christopher Allan Smith – drums , production , percussion , recording , mixing
 Jameel Bruner – production , keys , additional synths , additional organ , background vocals 
 Steve Lacy – production , bass , guitar , featured artist , executive production

Additional personnel

 Cisco Adler – production , guitar , recording 
 Brandon Combs – drums 
 Jimmy Douglass – mixing
 James Fauntleroy – featured artist 
 Durand Ferebee Jr. – background vocals 
 Christopher Goldsmith for The Highlights – production , drums 
 Nick Green – background vocals , vocal production
 Kaytranada – featured artist , production 
 Brian Kennedy – production 
 Dave Kutch – mastering
 Janelle Monáe – featured artist , additional vocals 
 Daniel "Bambaata" Marley – production , guitar 
 Vic Mensa – featured artist 
 Xavier McHugh – recording , percussion 
 Nicky Davey – production 
 Dave Rosser – guitar 
 Tay Walker – background vocals 
 Tyler, the Creator – featured artist , production

Charts

Release history

References

2015 albums
The Internet (band) albums
Odd Future Records albums
Albums produced by Kaytranada
Albums produced by Steve Lacy
Albums produced by Syd tha Kyd